Saheb Ramrao Khandare (Devanagari: साहेब रामराव खंदारे) (born July 5, 1962) is an Indian Indologist, folklorist critic and experimental poet who writes in the Marathi language.

Khandare is said to have brought consciousness techniques into Marathi drama. He introduced a new branch in history writing through his book Marathyancha Samajik Sanskrutik Ithas, i.e. socio-cultural history.

Khandare was the first to introduce the ‘Theory of Interdisciplinary Studies’ to India in 1993, and also formed a new ‘Folklorical Criticism’ for arts and literature.

Khandare was note for his teaching skills by Maharashtra Government in 2004.

Published Work

Poetry
 Ratrichya Kavita (1991)

Plays
 Brain Cancer (1990)
 Aata Ujadel (2002)

Criticism
 Swad-Aswad (1988)
 Lekh Aalekh (1991)
 Aatle Aawaj (2009)

Biography
 Muktai (1992)

Linguistics
 Vyawaharic Marathi (2002)
 Vyawaharic Marathi-II (2003)

Folklore Research
 Eka Lokkathecha Abhyas (2003)
 Aaradhyanchi lokgani (2003)
 Sumbran: Sankalan ani Shodh (2003)
 Loksahitya Sankalan ani Shodh (2004)		
 Loksahitya Shabda ani prayog (2003)
 Olakha Bara (2006)
 Loknatya Parampara (2009)
 Bhartiya Krushichi Loksanskruti (2009)
 Loksahityabhyas (2014)

Interdisciplinary Research
 Marathyancha Samajic Sanskritik Itihas (2008)
 Buddha Jatak Vol. 1 (2009)
 Bhartiya Krushisanskriti (2013)
 Sheti, Shetakari and Sharad Pawar (2014)

Literary Research
 Shivaji Maharajancha Powada (2008)
 Nijamkalin Marathawadi Sahitya (2010)

Edited Volumes
 Keshawayan (1993)
 Prachin Marathi Kavita (2002)
 Suwarnamahotsavi Maharashtra (2010)

References

Further reading
 Kant and Navnath, ‘Dr Saheb Khandare: Sahityasamikshya ani Sanshodhan’, Lokvidhya Publication, 2013
 Jivtode, Vitthal .‘Dr Saheb Khandare Yanche Sahitya ani Vichar, 2013 (a doctoral thesis)
 Nimbhore, Gajanan. ‘Interdisciplinary Research, Theory and Methodologies of Dr Saheb Khandare’, 2016  (a doctoral thesis)

Special Issues
 Lokvidya Patrica, 2014

Extra Links
 http://bsvlss.com

1962 births
Marathi-language writers
Indian male poets
Living people
Indian folklorists